Everard des Barres (also Eberhard von Barres or Eberhard De Bären) (died after 1176) was the third Grand Master of the Knights Templar from 1147 to 1152.

Everard was Master of the Templars in France and accompanied Louis VII of France on the Second Crusade. Upon the death of Robert de Craon in 1147, he was elected Grand Master of the Templar Order. His election was clearly influenced by the connection he had with Louis VII, since the Order needed to exploit those contacts and resources within France to maintain its military presence in the Holy Land. Everard later saved Louis during a battle with the Seljuk Turks in Pisidia.

According to the chronicler Odo of Deuil, Everard was extremely pious and valiant. He seems to have had a strong influence on Louis. After the failure of the crusade at the Siege of Damascus in 1148, Louis returned to France, followed by Everard, who was in charge of the king's treasury. Everard's Templars stayed behind and helped defend Jerusalem against a Turkish raid in 1149.

Back in France, Everard resigned in 1152 and became a monk at Clairvaux. He was succeeded by Bernard de Tremelay. He died some time after 1176.

References

Bibliography 

1174 deaths
Grand Masters of the Knights Templar
Christians of the Second Crusade
12th-century French people
Year of birth unknown